Below is a list of public holidays in Albania.

If a non-working public holiday happens during the weekend, then the Monday after would be non-working.

Official Holidays

Not official Holidays

References

 
Albanian culture
Society of Albania
Albania
Holidays

fr:Albanie#Fêtes et jours fériés